Serapis or Sarapis is a Graeco-Egyptian deity. The cult of Serapis was promoted during the third century BC on the orders of Greek Pharaoh Ptolemy I Soter of the Ptolemaic Kingdom in Egypt as a means to unify the Greeks and Egyptians in his realm.

The cultus of Serapis was spread as a matter of deliberate policy by the Ptolemaic kings. Serapis continued to increase in popularity during the Roman Empire, often replacing Osiris as the consort of Isis in temples outside Egypt.
Though Ptolemy I may have created the official cult of Serapis and endorsed him as a patron of the Ptolemaic dynasty and Alexandria, Serapis was a pre-existing syncretistic deity derived from the worship of the Egyptian Osiris and Apis and also gained attributes from other deities, such as chthonic powers linked to the Greek Hades and Demeter, and with benevolence derived from associations with Dionysus.

Iconography
Serapis was depicted as Greek in appearance but with Egyptian trappings, and combined iconography from a great many cults, signifying both abundance and resurrection.

The Greeks had little respect for animal-headed figures, and so a Greek-style anthropomorphic statue was chosen as the idol, and proclaimed as the equivalent of the highly popular Apis.
It was named Userhapi (i.e. "Osiris-Apis"), which became Greek Sarapis, and was said to be Osiris in full, rather than just his ka (life force).

The cult statue of Serapis that Ptolemy I erected in Alexandria enriched the texture of the Serapis conception by portraying him in a combination of both Egyptian and Greek styles.
The statue suitably depicted a figure resembling Hades or Pluto, both being kings of the Greek underworld, and was shown enthroned with the modius, a basket / grain-measure, on his head, since it was a Greek symbol for the land of the dead. He also held a sceptre in his hand indicating his rulership, with Cerberus, gatekeeper of the underworld, resting at his feet. The statue also had what appeared to be a serpent at its base, fitting the Egyptian symbol of rulership, the uraeus.

Etymology
Originally Demotic wsjr-ḥp, ("Osiris-Apis"), the name of the deity is derived from the syncretic worship of Osiris and the bull Apis as a single deity under the Egyptian name wsjr-ḥp. This name was later written in Coptic as  Userhapi; Greeks sometimes used an uncommon form Sorapis, slightly closer to the Egyptian name(s). 

The earliest mention of a "Sarapis" occurs in the disputed death scene of Alexander (323 BCE), but it is something of a mixup: The unconnected Babylonian god Ea (Enki) was titled Šar Apsi, meaning "king of the Apsu" or "the watery deep",
and Ea as Šar Apsi seems to be the deity intended in the description of Alexander's death. Since this "Sarapis" had a temple at Babylon, and was of such importance that only Sarapis is named as being consulted on behalf of the dying king, Sarapis of Babylon appears to have radically altered perceptions of mythologies in the post-Alexandrian era. His significance to the Hellenic psyche, due to the mention in the story of Alexander's death, may have also contributed to the choice of the similar-sounding Osiris-Apis as the chief Ptolemaic god, even if the Ptolemies understood that they were different deities.

Sarapis (earlier form) was the most common form in Ancient Greek until Roman times, when Serapis (later form) became common.

A serapeum ( serapeion) was any temple or religious precinct devoted to Serapis. The most renowned serapeum was in Alexandria.

Serapis cult history

There is evidence that the cult of Serapis existed before the Ptolemies came to power in Alexandria: A temple of Serapis in Egypt is mentioned in 323 BCE by both Plutarch and Arrian.

Ptolemy I Soter made efforts to integrate his new Egyptian subject's religions with that of their Hellenic rulers. Ptolemy's project was to find a deity that would win the reverence of both groups alike, despite the curses the Egyptian priests had chanted against the gods of the previous foreign rulers (e.g. Set, who was lauded by the Hyksos).
The common assertion that Ptolemy "created" the deity is derived from sources which describe him erecting a statue of Serapis in Alexandria. 

According to Plutarch, Ptolemy stole the cult statue from Sinope in Asia Minor, having been instructed in a dream by the "unknown god" to bring the statue to Alexandria, where the statue was pronounced to be Sarapis by two religious experts. One of the experts was of the Eumolpidae, the ancient family from whose members the hierophant of the Eleusinian Mysteries had been chosen since before history, and the other was the scholarly Egyptian priest Manetho, which gave weight to the judgement both for the Egyptians and the Greeks.

Plutarch may not be correct, however, as some Egyptologists allege that the "Sinope" in the tale is really the hill of Sinopeion, a name given to the site of the already existing Serapeum at Memphis. Also, according to Tacitus, Serapis (i.e., Apis explicitly identified as Osiris in full) had been the god of the village of Rhakotis before it expanded into the great capital of Alexandria.

With his (i.e. Osiris's) wife Isis, and their son Horus (in the form of Harpocrates), Serapis won an important place in the Greek world. In his 2nd-century CE Description of Greece, Pausanias notes two Serapeia on the slopes of Acrocorinth, above the rebuilt Roman city of Corinth and one at Copae in Boeotia.

Serapis figured among the international deities whose cult was received and disseminated throughout the Roman Empire, with Anubis sometimes identified with Cerberus. At Rome, Serapis was worshiped in the Iseum Campense, the sanctuary of Isis built during the Second Triumvirate in the Campus Martius. The Roman cults of Isis and Serapis gained in popularity late in the 1st century when Vespasian experienced events he attributed to their miraculous agency while he was in Alexandria, where he stayed before returning to Rome as emperor in 70 CE. From the Flavian Dynasty on, Serapis was one of the deities who might appear on imperial coinage with the reigning emperor.

The main cult at Alexandria survived until the late 4th century, when a Christian mob directed by Pope Theophilus of Alexandria destroyed the serapeum in Alexandria some time 385~389 CE, during one of the frequent religious riots in the city. Despite the mob violence, the cult of Serapis survived until 391 CE when Theodosius I banned all forms of pagan religion in the Edict of Thessalonica, when the Alexandrian serapeum was finally demolished.

In popular culture
Serapis is the main antagonist of the Rick Riordan short story The Staff of Serapis which crosses over two of his major series, The Kane Chronicles and Camp Half-Blood Chronicles. He is destroyed by Annabeth Chase and Sadie Kane after the former destroys the head representing the future on Serapis' staff. In the follow up story The Crown of Ptolemy, it's revealed that Serapis was awakened by the overall main antagonist Setne in order to test bringing Greek demigods and Egyptian magicians together.

See also
 Serapis Bey, the Ascended Master in charge of the Ascension Temple
 Greeks in Egypt

Notes

Gallery

References

Sources

 
 
 
 
 
  Vol. I: ; Vol. II: ; Vol. III: .

External links

 
 
 
 

 
Egyptian gods
Greek gods
Underworld gods
Hellenistic Egyptian deities
Osiris